The 2011–12 FA Vase was the 38th season of the FA Vase, an annual football competition for teams in the lower reaches of the English football league system.

Dunston UTS won the competition, beating West Auckland Town in the final.

Semi-finals

Dunston UTS won 3–2 on aggregate.

Final

References

FA Vase
FA Vase
FA Vase seasons